Two warships of Sweden have been named Hälsingland, after Hälsingland:

 , a  launched in 1959 and stricken in 1982.
 , a  launched in 1987 and since in active service.

Swedish Navy ship names